Neptunea polycostata is a species of sea snail, a marine gastropod mollusk in the family Buccinidae, the true whelks.

There is one subspecies: Neptunea polycostata aino Fraussen & Terryn, 2007 (synonym: Neptunea polycostata var. sculpturata Golikov, 1963)

Description

Distribution

References

Buccinidae
Gastropods described in 1955
Marine gastropods